Chiara Gazzoli (born 21 August 1978) is an Italian former football striker.

Club career 
She played for ACF Milan, Foroni Verona, Torres CF and ASD Fiammamonza between 1994 and 2007, when she turned to 7-a-side football. She won four leagues with Milan, Foroni and Fiammamonza, and was the league's top scorer in 2003 and 2004. Her 54 goals in 2003 make her the second top scoring player in one season in Serie A, next to Elisabetta Vignotto's 1972 56-goal record. She was also the top scorer of the 2004 UEFA Women's Cup.

International career 
She was a member of the Italian national team, and played the 2005 European Championship.

References

1978 births
Living people
People from Cernusco sul Naviglio
Italian women's footballers
Italy women's international footballers
Serie A (women's football) players
A.S.D. AGSM Verona F.C. players
Torres Calcio Femminile players
Footballers from Lombardy
Women's association football forwards
ASD Fiammamonza 1970 players
ACF Milan players
Sportspeople from the Metropolitan City of Milan
Foroni Verona F.C. players